Water polo will be contested at the 2011 Summer Universiade from August 11 to August 23 at the Bao’an Natatorium in Shenzhen, China.

Medal summary

Medal table

Events

Men

The men's tournament will be held from August 11 to August 23. A maximum of sixteen teams will compete.

Teams

Pool A

Pool B

Pool C

Pool D

Women

The women's tournament will be held from August 12 to August 22. A maximum of ten teams will compete.

Teams

Pool A

Pool B

References

 
2011 Summer Universiade events
2011
2011